Jake Lamar (born in 1961 in The Bronx, New York City) is an African-American writer, novelist, playwright, and cultural critic  living in Paris.

After graduating from Harvard University, Lamar spent six years writing for Time magazine. He has lived in Paris since 1993 and teaches creative writing at Sciences Po. At age 28, he wrote his first autobiography, Bourgeois Blues, in which he evoked his relationship with his father. With it, he won the Lyndhurst Prize, which convinced him to devote himself entirely to his passion for writing. In 1993, inspired by the American writers F. Scott Fitzgerald, Ernest Hemingway, Gertrude Stein, Richard Wright, and James Baldwin, he moved to Paris in the 18th arrondissement, where he still resides. In 1996 he published The Last Integrationist, a satirical commentary of contemporary America, criticizing the pace of racial integration and the omnipresent television spectacle he sees as typical of the United States. On March 29, 2015, two days after his 54th birthday, Lamar suffered a near-death experience as a victim of a near-fatal heart problem. After several months of convalescence in French hospitals, Lamar published an article in the Los Angeles Times reporting on the high quality and humanity of the socialist system of health care in France. His most recent work, Viper's Dream (No Exit Press, 2023) is a hard-boiled crime novel set in the jazz world of Harlem between the years 1936 and 1961. A version of Viper's Dream was broadcast (in French) as a 10-episode radio play in 2019. That production included many jazz tracks of the period. Viper's Dream was published in French as a novel by Rivages/Noir in 2021.

Fiction in English 
 Bourgeois Blues (Summit Books 1991)
 The Last Integrationist (Crown 1996)
 Close to the Bone (Crown 1999)
 If 6 were 9 (Crown 2001)
 Rendezvous Eighteenth (Minotaur 2003)
 Ghosts of Saint-Michel (Minotaur 2006)
 Viper's Dream (No Exit Press 2023)

Fiction in French 
 Le caméléon noir (Rivages/Noir 2003)
 Nous avions un rêve (Rivages/Noir 2005)
 New York Transfer (Biro 2007)
 Rendez-vous dans le 18ème (Rivages/Thriller 2007)
 Les Fantômes de Saint-Michel (Rivages/Thriller 2009)
 Confessions d'un fils modèle (Payot/Rivages 2009)
 Postérité (Rivages 2014)
 Viper's Dream (Rivages/Noir 2021)

Plays 
 Brothers in Exile
 Brothers in Exile (radio play)
 Viper's Dream (radio play)

Awards
 Lyndhurst Prize (for his first book, Bourgeois Blues)
 Centre National du Livre grant (for his novel Postérité)
 France’s Grand Prize for best foreign thriller (for his novel The Last Integrationist)
 Beaumarchais fellowship for his play Brothers in Exile

References

External links
 Jake Lamar Official Home Page

20th-century American novelists
American art critics
1961 births
Living people
21st-century American novelists
American film critics
American male novelists
20th-century American male writers
21st-century American male writers
Novelists from New York (state)
20th-century American non-fiction writers
21st-century American non-fiction writers
American male non-fiction writers
Harvard College alumni